Accra plumbeana is a species of moth of the family Tortricidae. It is found in Kenya and Tanzania.

References

Moths described in 1966
Tortricini
Moths of Africa